Sergey Anatolyevich Fedorovtsev (born 31 January 1980) is a Russian rower.

Career
Competing in quadruple sculls, he won a gold medal at the 2004 Olympics and the European title in 2011 and 2015. His teams placed seventh and eighth at the 2008 and 2012 Games, respectively.

He was disqualified from competing at the 2016 Olympics after a positive out-of-competition drug test (trimetazidine), and subsequently given a 4-year ban.

References

External links
 

1980 births
Russian male rowers
Rowers at the 2004 Summer Olympics
Rowers at the 2008 Summer Olympics
Rowers at the 2012 Summer Olympics
Olympic rowers of Russia
Medalists at the 2004 Summer Olympics
Olympic medalists in rowing
Olympic gold medalists for Russia
Doping cases in rowing
Russian sportspeople in doping cases
Sportspeople from Rostov-on-Don
Living people
European Rowing Championships medalists